Ahmet Emin Aktan is an American engineer, focusing in health monitoring, currently the John Roebling Professor of Infrastructure Studies at Drexel University. He is an Honorary Professor at Muğla University.

Education
Post-Doctoral Research in Earthquake-Structural Engineering at University of California, Berkeley (1979-1984)
Ph.D. in Earthquake Structural Engineering from the University of Illinois at Urbana-Champaign (1970-1973)
B.S. (1967) and M.Sc. (1968) in Civil/Structural Engineering, Middle East Technical University (METU), Ankara

References

Year of birth missing (living people)
Living people
Drexel University faculty
21st-century American engineers
UC Berkeley College of Engineering alumni
Grainger College of Engineering alumni